Couscous – sometimes called kusksi or kseksu – is a traditional North African dish of small steamed granules of rolled semolina that is often served with a stew spooned on top. Pearl millet, sorghum, bulgur, and other cereals are sometimes cooked in a similar way in other regions, and the resulting dishes are also sometimes called couscous.

Couscous is a staple food throughout the Maghrebi cuisines of Algeria, Tunisia, Mauritania, Morocco, and Libya. It was integrated into French and European cuisine at the beginning of the twentieth century, through the French colonial empire and the Pieds-Noirs of Algeria.

In 2020, couscous was added to UNESCO's Intangible Cultural Heritage list.

Etymology 
The word "couscous" (alternately cuscus or kuskus) was first noted in early 17th century French, from Arabic kuskus, from kaskasa ‘to pound’, and is probably of Berber origin. The exact formation of the word presents some obscurities.

The Berber root *KS means "well formed, well rolled, rounded." Numerous names and pronunciations for couscous exist around the world.

History 

It is unclear when couscous originated. Food historian Lucie Bolens believes couscous originated millennia ago, during the reign of Masinissa in the ancient kingdom of Numidia in present-day Algeria. Traces of cooking vessels akin to couscoussiers have been found in graves from the 3rd century BC, from the time of the berber kings of Numidia, in the city of Tiaret, Algeria. Couscoussiers dating back to the 12th century were found in the ruins of Igiliz, located in the Sous valley of Morocco.

According to food writer Charles Perry, couscous originated among the Berbers of Algeria and Morocco between the end of the 11th-century Zirid dynasty, modern-day Algeria, and the rise of the 13th-century Almohad Caliphate. The historian Hady Idris noted that couscous is attested to during the Hafsid dynasty, but not the Zirid dynasty.

In the twelfth century, Maghrebi cooks were preparing dishes of non-mushy grains by stirring flour with water to create light, round balls of couscous dough that could be steamed.

The historian Maxime Rodinson found three recipes for couscous from the 13th-century Arabic cookbook Kitab al-Wusla ila al-Habib, written by an Ayyubid author, and the anonymous Arabic cooking book Kitab al tabikh and Ibn Razin al-Tujibi's Fadalat al-khiwan also contain recipes.

Couscous is believed to have been spread among the inhabitants of the Iberian Peninsula by the Berber dynasties of the thirteenth century, though it is not found in traditional Spanish or Portuguese cuisine anymore. In modern-day Trapani, Sicily, the dish is still made to the medieval recipe of Andalusian author Ibn Razin al-Tujibi. Ligurian families that moved from Tabarka to Sardinia brought the dish with them to Carloforte in the 18th century.

Known in France since the 16th century, it was brought into French cuisine at the beginning of the 20th century via the French colonial empire and the Pieds-Noirs.

Preparation 

Couscous is traditionally made from semolina, the hardest part of the grain of durum wheat (the hardest of all forms of wheat), which resists the grinding of the millstone. The semolina is sprinkled with water and rolled with the hands to form small pellets, sprinkled with dry flour to keep them separate, and then sieved. Any pellets that are too small to be finished, granules of couscous fall through the sieve and are again rolled and sprinkled with dry semolina and rolled into pellets. This labor-intensive process continues until all the semolina has been formed into tiny couscous granules. In the traditional method of preparing couscous, groups of people come together to make large batches over several days, which are then dried in the sun and used for several months. Handmade couscous may need to be rehydrated as it is prepared; this is achieved by a process of moistening and steaming over stew until the couscous reaches the desired light and fluffy consistency.

In some regions, couscous is made from farina or coarsely ground barley or pearl millet.

In modern times, couscous production is largely mechanized, and the product is sold worldwide. This couscous can be sauteed before it is cooked in water or another liquid. Properly cooked couscous is light and fluffy, not gummy or gritty.

Traditionally, North Africans use a food steamer (called a taseksut in the Berber language, a  kiskas in the Arabic language or a couscoussier in the French language). The base is a tall metal pot shaped like an oil jar, where the meat and vegetables are cooked as a stew. On top of the base, a steamer sits where the couscous is cooked, absorbing the flavours from the stew. The steamer's lid has holes around its edge so steam can escape. It is also possible to use a pot with a steamer insert. If the holes are too big, the steamer can be lined with damp cheesecloth. There is little archaeological evidence of early diets (including couscous), possibly because the original couscoussier may have been made from organic materials that could not survive extended exposure to the elements.

The couscous that is sold in most Western grocery stores is usually pre-steamed and dried. It is typically prepared by adding 1.5 measures of boiling water or stock to each measure of couscous and then leaving it covered tightly for about five minutes. Pre-steamed couscous takes less time to prepare than regular couscous, most dried pasta, or dried grains (such as rice). Packaged sets of quick-preparation couscous and canned vegetables, and generally meat, are routinely sold in European grocery stores and supermarkets. Couscous is widely consumed in France, where it was introduced by Maghreb immigrants and voted the third most popular dish in a 2011 survey.

Recognition 
In December 2020, Algeria, Mauritania, Morocco, and Tunisia obtained official recognition for the knowledge, know-how, and practices pertaining to the production and consumption of couscous on the Representative List of the Intangible Cultural Heritage of Humanity by UNESCO. The joint submission by the four countries was hailed as an "example of international cooperation."

Local variations 

Couscous proper is about 2 mm in diameter, but there also exists a larger variety (3 mm more) known as berkoukes, as well as an ultra-fine version (around 1 mm). In Morocco, Algeria, Tunisia, and Libya, it is generally served with vegetables (carrots, potatoes, and turnips) cooked in a spicy or mild broth or stew, usually with some meat (generally, chicken, lamb, or mutton).

Algeria 

Algerian couscous is a traditional staple food in Algeria, and it plays an important role in Algerian culture and cuisine. It is commonly served with vegetables, meat, or fish. In Algeria, there are various types of couscous dishes, each with its unique recipe and preparation method.

Regional variations of couscous in Algeria also exist. One popular Algerian dishe made with couscous is Mesfouf. It is a sweet couscous dish that is typically served during special occasions and festivals, such as weddings and Eid. The couscous is cooked with butter, cinnamon, sugar, and raisins, and served with milk or cream. Mesfouf is also often accompanied by dates, almonds, and other nuts. 

It is difficult to determine an exact number of couscous dishes in Algeria, as different regions and families may have their unique variations and recipes. However, it is true that there is a wide variety of couscous dishes in Algeria, with different ingredients, spices, and cooking methods used to create unique and flavorful meals.

Algerian cuisine is diverse, and the use of local ingredients, spices, and cooking techniques can lead to a vast array of couscous dishes.

While the exact number of couscous dishes in Algeria may be debated, with estimates ranging from 300 to 1000 different varieties, it is generally acknowledged that there is a wide range of couscous variations in the country, reflecting the diversity and richness of Algerian culture and cuisine.

Morocco 
Moroccan couscous is a popular dish in Moroccan cuisine and is considered one of the national dishes of Morocco. It is a flavorful and hearty dish that consists of small steamed balls of semolina wheat, also known as couscous, served with a variety of vegetables and meats. The broth or stew that accompanies Moroccan couscous can vary, and different vegetables and meats are used. Some of the most popular ingredients include onions, carrots, chickpeas, tomatoes, and lamb or beef. Moroccan spices, such as cumin, coriander, and turmeric, are added to give the dish a unique and flavorful taste. Moroccan couscous is typically served in a communal platter or bowl, and diners use their hands to form small balls of couscous and dip them into the broth or stew. It is a social and interactive way of eating, with friends and family sharing the same dish. Moroccan couscous also has some regional variations, with some areas adding additional ingredients like raisins, dates, and almonds to the couscous or the stew.

Tunisia 

In Tunisia, couscous is usually spicy, made with harissa sauce, and served commonly with vegetables and meat, including lamb, fish, seafood, beef, and sometimes (in southern regions) camel. Fish couscous is a Tunisian specialty and can also be made with octopus, squid or other seafood in a hot, red, spicy sauce.
Couscous can also be served as a dessert. It is then called Masfuf. Masfuf can also contain raisins, grapes, or pomegranate seeds.

Libya 
In Libya, couscous is mostly served with lamb (but sometimes camel meat or, rarely, beef) in Tripoli and the western parts of Libya, but not during official ceremonies or weddings. Another way to eat couscous is as a dessert; it is prepared with dates, sesame, and pure honey and is locally referred to as maghrood.

Mauritania 
In Mauritania, the couscous uses large wheat grains (mabroum) and is darker than the yellow couscous of Morocco. It is cooked with lamb, beef, or camel meat together with vegetables, primarily onion, tomato, and carrots, then mixed with a sauce and served with ghee, locally known as dhen.

Similar foods 
Couscous is made from crushed wheat flour rolled into its constituent granules or pearls, making it distinct from pasta, even pasta such as orzo and risoni of similar size, which is made from ground wheat and either molded or extruded. Couscous and pasta have similar nutritional value, although pasta is usually more refined.

Several dishes worldwide are also made from granules, like those of couscous rolled from flour from grains or other milled or grated starchy crops.
 Attiéké, a staple food in Côte d'Ivoire and also known to surrounding regions of West Africa, is made from granulated grated cassava.
 Cuscuz is a couscous-like dish from the Northeast Region of Brazil. It is made out of cornmeal and eaten hot with meat and cold with milk. In the state of São Paulo the cuscuz is pressed into a mold decorated with orange slices, in a dish called "cuscuz Paulista," a variation of the original version made by locals after migrant waves from the Northeast Region.
 Dambou is a couscous-like dish from Niger. It may be made from semolina for special occasions but is often made with rice, millet, or other grain. Moringa leaves are traditionally included in the dish. In France, this Nigerien dish has been adapted as a specific variant (called couscous aux épinards) of the Maghreb-syle couscous commonly found there, often using spinach in place of the moringa.
 Fregula is a type of pasta from Sardinia. It is similar to North African Berkoukes and Middle Eastern Moghrabieh. Fregula comes in varying sizes but typically consists of semolina dough rolled into balls 2–3 mm in diameter and toasted in an oven.
 Kouskousaki (Κουσκουσάκι (in the Greek language) or kuskus (in the Turkish language) is a pasta from Greece and Turkey, that is boiled and served with cheese and walnuts.

 In the Levant, the dish known as moghrabieh (a reference to the Maghreb region) uses the same durum-based semolina flour but rolled into larger ( in diameter) 'pearls' to create a dish that is popular across Jordan, Lebanon and Syria. The pearls are either cooked as part of a stew or flavored with cinnamon and served alongside a chicken and chickpea broth.
Palestinian maftoul uses granules that are larger than the North African variety but smaller than moghrabieh pearls ( in diameter) and made with bulgur, not durum wheat. It is similarly served alongside a chicken and chickpea broth. "Maftoul" is an Arabic word derived from the root "fa-ta-la," which means to roll or to twist, describing the hand-rolling method used to make the granules.
 Israeli couscous, known in Hebrew as ptitim (lit. 'flakes', singular: פְּתִית, lit. 'flake'), is made up of tiny balls of toasted pasta. It was developed in Israel in the 1950s when rice was scarce due to austerity in Israel as a higher protein alternative. Despite its name in English, it is not a type of couscous (plural: כַּסְכּוּסִים).
 Wusu-Wusu is a couscous that is prepared out of fonio in the Hausa region of Nigeria, Benin, Togo and Ghana.

See also 

 North African cuisine: Moroccan cuisine, Berber cuisine, Algerian cuisine, Tunisian cuisine, Libyan cuisine and Egyptian cuisine
 List of Middle Eastern dishes
 List of African dishes

Notes

References 

African cuisine
Algerian cuisine
Arab cuisine
Beninese cuisine
Berber cuisine
Cape Verdean cuisine
Egyptian cuisine
French cuisine
Gambian cuisine
Greek cuisine
Guinean cuisine
Israeli cuisine
Italian cuisine
Jewish cuisine
Jordanian cuisine
Levantine cuisine
Libyan cuisine
Maghrebi cuisine
Mauritanian cuisine
Mediterranean cuisine
Middle Eastern cuisine
Moroccan cuisine
Nigerien cuisine
North African cuisine
Palestinian cuisine
Senegalese cuisine
Sephardi Jewish cuisine
Syrian cuisine
Tunisian cuisine
Turkish cuisine
West African cuisine
Vegan cuisine
Staple foods
Steamed foods
Wheat dishes
National dishes
Semolina dishes
Intangible Cultural Heritage of Humanity